Jean-Pierre Kress (1 March 1930 – 22 April 2021) was a French footballer. He played in one match for the France national football team in 1953. He was also named in France's squad for the Group 4 qualification tournament for the 1954 FIFA World Cup.

References

External links
 

1930 births
2021 deaths
French footballers
France international footballers
Footballers from Strasbourg
Association footballers not categorized by position